The 1905–06 Army Cadets men's ice hockey season was the 3rd season of play for the program.

Season
For Army's third season of ice hockey, the program played a majority of games against other colleges for the first time.

Roster

Standings

Schedule and results

|-
!colspan=12 style=";" | Regular Season

References

Army Black Knights men's ice hockey seasons
Army
Army
Army
Army